Julie Hyzy is an American author of mystery fiction.

Life and career 
Hyzy writes a series of books about sleuth Alex St James, a news researcher, which combines mystery and adventure, and another about Olivia Paras, assistant chef at the White house, which sits in the subgenre "culinary mysteries". Her State of the Onion, from the latter series, won an Anthony Award and other awards. She has a third series, the Manor House Mysteries, featuring amateur sleuth Grace Wheaton, curator of palatial Marshfield Manor.

Hyzy studied business at college and worked in business-related jobs until taking up fiction writing. She also writes under two pseudonyms, N. C. Hyzy and S. F. Hyzy.

Books 
Alex St James series
Deadly Blessings (2005) Five Star. 
Deadly Interest (2006) Five Star. 
Dead Ringer (2008) Five Star.  (with Michael A. Black)

White House Chef Mysteries - Ollie Paras series
State of the Onion (2008) Berkley Prime Crime Press.  (2009 Anthony Award for Best Paperback Original, 2009 Barry Award for Best Paperback Original, 2009 Lovey Award for Best Traditional Mystery.)
Hail to the Chef (2008) Berkley Prime Crime Press. 
Eggsecutive Orders (2010) Berkley Prime Crime Press. 
Buffalo West Wing (2011) Berkley Prime Crime Press. 
Affairs of Steak (2012) Berkley Prime Crime Press. 
Fonduing Fathers (2012) Berkley Prime Crime Press. 
Home of the Braised (2014) Berkley Prime Crime Press. 
All the President's Menus (2015) Berkley Prime Crime Press. 
Foreign Eclairs (2016) Berkley Prime Crime Press. 

Manor House Mysteries - Grace Wheaton series
Grace Under Pressure (2010) Berkley Prime Crime Press. 
Grace Interrupted (2011) Berkley Prime Crime Press. 
Grace Among Thieves (2012) Berkley Prime Crime Press. 
Grace Takes Off (2013) Berkley Prime Crime Press. 
Grace Against the Clock (2014) Berkley Prime Crime Press. 

Other
Artistic License (2004) Five Star. 

Ebooks as N. C. Hyzy
Playing With Matches, a Riley Drake Mystery
Mystery Short Stories

See also 
Mystery (fiction)
List of female detective/mystery writers
List of female detective characters

References 

21st-century American novelists
21st-century American women writers
American mystery novelists
American women novelists
Anthony Award winners
Barry Award winners
Living people
Women mystery writers
Year of birth missing (living people)